Uniross is a brand with presence mainly in Europe & UK markets. Founded in 1968 in Bristol, UK it primarily deals in manufacturing of consumer & industrial batteries, chargers & lighting products.

History 
Founded in 1968 in Bristol, UK, the company became extremely popular with its rechargeable batteries and commanded a market share of 60% in the UK's retail market in 2006. Uniross over the years underwent many changes before being presently controlled by a French group. The company since its last takeover in 2012 has diversified its portfolio and also ventured into portable lighting and now offers LED home lights and portable LED products like flashlights and headlamps. Uniross products have their presence in over 70 countries mainly in the EU, UK and SE Asia region.

See also
Flashlight
Eveready East Africa
Ucar batteries
British Ever Ready Electrical Company
P. R. Mallory and Co Inc
Gold Peak

References

Electronics companies of France
Consumer battery manufacturers
Electronics companies established in 1968
1968 establishments in England
1992 mergers and acquisitions